Menglai Township is a rural township in Cangyuan Va Autonomous County, Yunnan, China.  it had a population of 14,443 and an area of . It borders Gengma Dai and Va Autonomous County in the north, Mengsheng Town in the east, Nuoliang Township and Mengjiao Township in the south, and Banhong Township in the west.

Name
The word Menglai is transliteration in Wa language. "Meng" means basin and "Lai" means small.

History
In the early history, the township had always been under Tusi jurisdiction. In 1984 Menglai District was established. It was upgraded to a township in 1988.

Administrative division
As of 2017, the township is divided into 9 villages: Minliang, Yong'an, Dinglai, Gongnong, Yingge, Banlie, Menglai, Gongsa, and Manlai.

Geography
There are a number of popular mountains located immediately adjacent to the townsite which include Mount Wokan; Mount Bankao; and Mount Gongda.

The Mengdong River and Dangpa River, tributaries of the Lancang River, flow through the township.

Economy
Menglai Township's economy is based on nearby mineral resources and agricultural resources. The region abounds with lead, zinc, manganese, coal and iron. Sugarcane, tea, tobacco and rapeseed are the main cash crops.

Education
The township has 10 public schools: 9 primary schools and 1 middle school.

Attractions
Part of the township belongs to Nangun River Natural Protection Area.

Cangyuan rock painting is a famous scenic spot in the township.

References

Bibliography
 

Divisions of Cangyuan Va Autonomous County